Together Alone is the debut studio album by English singer Alex Hepburn. The album was released on 12 April 2013 through Warner Bros. Records. The record includes two singles "Under" and "Miss Misery". The album has charted well in many European countries, peaking at number two in the Swiss charts.

Track listing

Charts

Weekly charts

Year-end charts

Certifications

References

External links
Together Alone on alex-hepburn.com

2013 debut albums